Charles Guillaume Frédéric Boson de Talleyrand-Périgord (16 May 1832 – 21 February 1910), prince of Sagan (from 1845), duke of Sagan and duke of Talleyrand (from 1898) was a famous French dandy, and the grandson of Dorothea von Biron.

Early life
He was the son of Napoléon Louis, III. duc de Talleyrand-Périgord (1811-1898) and Anne Louise Charlotte Alix de Montmorency (1810-1858).  His paternal grandparents were Alexandre de Talleyrand-Périgord, Duke of Dino (1787–1872) and later duc de Talleyrand-Périgord, and of Dorothea of Courland, Duchess of Sagan (1793–1862). His maternal grandfather was the Duke of Montmorency.

Career
A cavalry officer, he was one of the major figures in French high society in the second half of the 19th century.  Boni de Castellane wrote of him:

Peerage
In 1898, upon the death of his father, he succeeded to his father's titles, becoming His Serene Highness, the 4th Duke of Talleyrand and Herzog zu Sagan.  On 10 July 1912, he was confirmed as the 5th Duke of Dino by King Umberto II of Italy.  After his death, his titles passed to his son, Hélie de Talleyrand-Périgord, Duke of Sagan.

Personal life

In 1858, he married Jeanne Seillière (1839-1905), the heiress to Baron de Seilliere, army supply contractor who had enriched himself during the Franco-Prussian War. Together, they had two children:

 Marie Pierre Camille Louis Hélie de Talleyrand-Périgord, 4th Duke of Talleyrand (1859-1937), who married Anna Gould. She was previously married to Hélie's cousin Boni de Castellane from 1895 to 1906.
 Paul Louis Marie Archambault Boson de Talleyrand-Périgord, aka "Duke de Valençay", 5th Duke of Talleyrand (1867-1952), who married Helen Stuyvesant Morton (1876–1952), daughter of former U.S. Vice President Levi P. Morton.  They divorced in 1904.

Talleyrand died on 21 February 1910.

References

External links
 

1832 births
1910 deaths
Boson
People of the Second French Empire
People of the French Third Republic
French princes
 3
Dukes of Żagań
Members of the Prussian House of Lords
Peers of France